Arvin Moazami Godarzi (born 26 March 1990 in Borujerd) is an Iranian-Canadian cyclist, who currently rides for UCI Continental team .

Major results

2009
 1st Stage 1 Milad De Nour Tour
 2nd  Team pursuit, Asian Track Championships
2010
 3rd Road race, Iranian National Road Championships
 3rd Overall Milad De Nour Tour
2011
 2nd  Scratch, Asian Track Championships
2012
 Asian Under-23 Road Championships
1st  Time trial
3rd  Road race
2013
 2nd  Road race, Asian Road Championships
 6th Overall Tour of Iran
2014
 2nd  Road race, Asian Games
 4th Overall Tour of Iran
 5th Overall Tour de Singkarak
 6th Overall Tour de East Java
2015
 1st Overall Tour de Singkarak
1st Mountains classification
 2nd  Madison, Asian Track Championships
 Iranian National Road Championships
3rd Road race
3rd Time trial
 6th Overall Tour of Fuzhou
 8th Road race, Asian Road Championships
2016
 Iranian National Road Championships
1st  Time trial
2nd Road race
 1st Overall Jelajah Malaysia
1st Stage 2
 1st Overall Tour of Fuzhou
1st Stage 1
 3rd Overall Tour of Iran
 7th Tour of Almaty
2017
 2nd Overall Tour de Flores
1st Stage 3
 9th Overall Tour of Xingtai
 10th Overall Tour de Ijen
1st Stage 4
2018
 2nd  Scratch, Asian Track Championships
 Asian Road Championships
2nd  Team time trial
3rd  Time trial
 6th Time trial, Asian Games
2019
 8th Road race, Canadian National Road Championships

References

External links

1990 births
Living people
People from Borujerd
Iranian male cyclists
Canadian male cyclists
Asian Games silver medalists for Iran
Asian Games medalists in cycling
Cyclists at the 2014 Asian Games
Cyclists at the 2016 Summer Olympics
Olympic cyclists of Iran
Medalists at the 2014 Asian Games
Cyclists at the 2018 Asian Games
21st-century Iranian people